Little Humby or Humby is a hamlet in the South Kesteven district of Lincolnshire, England.

Humby has a ford that is prone to flooding, and a red telephone box. Inhabitants petitioned to keep the box when the local council made plans for a modern replacement.

Local wildlife includes badgers, and birds such as blue tits, wrens, chaffinches, seagulls, kestrels, red kites and buzzards.

Richard Todd, actor, lived and died at Little Humby.

References

External links

Hamlets in Lincolnshire
Humby